In Greek mythology, the Sons of Aegyptus were the fifty progeny of the king of Egypt, Aegyptus. They married their cousins, the fifty daughters of Danaus, twin brother of Aegyptus. In the most common version of the myth, they were all killed except one, Lynceus, who was saved by his wife Hypermnestra on their wedding night.

Apollodorus 

The list in the Bibliotheca preserves not only the names of brides and grooms, but also those of their mothers. A lot was cast among the sons of Aegyptus to decide which of the Danaids each should marry except for those daughters born to Memphis who were joined by their namesakes, the sons of Tyria. According to Hippostratus, Aegyptus had these progeny by a single woman called Eurryroe, daughter of Nilus.

Hyginus 

Gaius Julius Hyginus' list is partially corrupt and some of the names (marked with *) are nearly illegible. Nevertheless, it is evident that this catalogue has almost nothing in common with that of Pseudo-Apollodorus.

Notes

References 

 Gaius Julius Hyginus, Fabulae from The Myths of Hyginus translated and edited by Mary Grant. University of Kansas Publications in Humanistic Studies. Online version at the Topos Text Project.
 John Tzetzes, Book of Histories, Book VII-VIII translated by Vasiliki Dogani from the original Greek of T. Kiessling's edition of 1826.  Online version at theio.com
 Pseudo-Apollodorus, The Library with an English Translation by Sir James George Frazer, F.B.A., F.R.S. in 2 Volumes, Cambridge, MA, Harvard University Press; London, William Heinemann Ltd. 1921. Online version at the Perseus Digital Library. Greek text available from the same website.